Lawrence Oluwawemimo Arokodare (15 March 1938 – 26 March 1993) was a Nigerian civil engineer.  He was the founding Partner of the firm Etteh Aro and Partners, a foremost indigenous Civil Engineering Consultancy Firm in Nigeria. He was a native of Ijero Ekiti in Ekiti State, South-West of Nigeria. He began his career in Ove Arup and Partners in 1964 and worked there till 1970 when he began private practice with his undergraduate classmate. His philosophy of developing indigenous capacity in the Civil Engineering profession has led the firm he co-founded to sponsor over 55 engineering personnel for postgraduate studies outside Nigeria. He was involved in the design and supervision of several Civil Engineering projects during his lifetime.

Early life and education
Arokodare was born in Ijero Ekiti on 15 March 1938, to the family of Chief John Afolabi Arokodare of Ijero Ekiti and Madam Esther Ibironke Aiyelabola of Iyin Ekiti, Ekiti State, South-West, Nigeria. He had primary school education at Emmanuel Primary School, Ado Ekiti, Ekiti State from 1945 to 1952. He proceeded to the Government College Ibadan for secondary school education from 1952 to 1959, where he obtained both his School Certificate and Higher School Certificate. While at the Government College Ibadan, he joined the Nigerian Cadet Force and obtained Military Certificate A Part 1 in 1958. He was admitted to the Ahmadu Bello University Zaria in 1961 to study mechanical engineering but he transferred to civil engineering in the second year after his vacation job with Shell Petroleum Development Company in Port Harcourt. He obtained a Bachelor of Science degree in civil engineering from Ahmadu Bello University Zaria, Nigeria in 1964. His class was the last that sat for London University external B.Sc. in engineering degree through the University of Ibadan in 1964. He proceeded to the University of Leeds for a Master of Science degree in transportation engineering in 1969. He was married to Madam Oladunni Arokodare, had a daughter and three sons.

Engineering career
Arokodare’s professional career began after his graduation from the Ahmadu Bello University Zaria in 1964. He got employment at the Ibadan Office of Ove-Arup and Partners. He was involved in the Road Development Study in the then Western Nigeria for the World Bank. The projects he worked on projects which included the 205m long Mainyu bridge in Cameroun, Ife-Ondo-Ore, Ijebu-Ode-Idi Ayunre road and bridges, 75m long two lane steel arch bridge over River Wolale in Sokoto State, 75kM road between Ibadan and Ife, the Western Nigerian Marketing Board Office Building in Ikeja, the Doctors Hostel University Teaching Hospital Ibadan, the Institute of Education Building, University of Ibadan and Phase 1 of the Sport Stadium, University of Ife.

In 1970, he became a Principal Partner in the firm, Etteh Aro and Partners Consulting Engineers, Ibadan. Arokodare also supervised a number of projects as the Principal Partner of Etteh Aro and Partners Consulting Engineers. These included the rehabilitation of roads such as the 150kM Benin-Asaba road, 160kM Iddo-Kaba and Lokoja road, 110kM Zaria-Gusua road, 240kM Nasarawa-Loko-Otukpo-Oju road, 144kM Onitsha-Enugu road, to mention a few. He also supervised a number of roads in the Federal Capital Territory, which included the Ring Road 1, Airport Expressway, and outer Northern Expressway.
He was consultant for a number of projects for both private and government establishments. Some of these projects included consultant on the design of the 5.5kM road linking University of Ife and its Teaching Hospital, the 44kM Eastern leg of outer Ring Road of Benin, Ikeja Stadium Complex, Lagos and NITEL Housing programme, Abuja. He was also a consultant of the evaluation of tenders, qualifications and bid document of a number of projects.

His professional qualifications included the following: Member, Institution of Highway Engineers (MIHE) 1958; Member, Institution of Civil Engineers (MICE) 1969; Member, Nigerian Society of Engineers (MNSE) 1970; and he became a Fellow of the Nigerian Society of Engineers (FNSE) in 1982. Other qualifications obtained by him include: Military Certificate A Part 1 in 1958, Chairman/Convener of Transportation Committee of the Engineers in 1977 and 1978; and the Director (Odua Representative) on the Board of Solel Boneh Nigeria Limited.

Contribution to national development
Arokodare once said: “If you want to develop a place, develop the people first.” Lawrence was an exceptional philanthropist. He would give away anything he had if someone asked for it. This philosophy has led the firm he co-founded to sponsor over 55 engineering personnel for postgraduate studies outside Nigeria. Engr. Arokodare gave his entire life to the practice, articulation and development of his chosen and obviously much loved profession through which he served humanity so meritoriously that he departed this planet earth with little or no earthly possession other than the human beings whom he helped to train and the engineering practice which he nurtured to maturity and which stands today as a shining example of African professional entrepreneurship and innate ability to excel.

Technical publications
Arokodare loved to communicate his ideas and research work with professional colleagues. The following are some of his papers and articles:
VTOL and VSTOL Air Crafts on short and medium range travel. Paper read at Transportation Seminar, Leeds University UK. March 1969.
Some essentials of the Road and Airport Networks Reconstruction Programme for Nigeria. Paper read and published in the Nigerian Engineer Vol. 5 No. 5, pp 35 to 41. September 1969.
Current Approach to the Development of Major Rural Highways in South Western Nigeria (Joint Writers: Arokodare/Etteh/Adigun). Paper read to the Nigerian Society of Engineers, Lagos Branch. April 1972.
Problems of Consulting Engineers in the Private Sector. Article read to the Nigerian Society of Engineers, Ibadan Branch. May 1973.
Article on Safe Stopping and Passing Sight Distances on Rural Highways. Published in Estate Chronicle. Journal of the Nigerian Institute of Estate Surveyors Vol.1/No.1. pp 23 to 27. February 1974.
Highway Development and Transportation. Paper read and published in Proceedings of National Conference on Engineering Profession and the Implementation of 3rd National Development Plan. Pp 73 to 105. December 1975.
Engineering Properties of Sub-Grade Materials in Road Construction in Nigeria. (A co-operation between the Highway Division of the Federal Ministry of Works and the Nigerian Society of Engineers.)
Transfer of Technology and Cost Reduction. Paper read to the Nigerian Institute of Management (NIM), Ibadan Branch. March 1984. Published in NIM Journal of May 1985.
Compartmentalization of Certificate. Paper presented at the Conference/AGM of Nigerian Institution of Architects (NIA), Kaduna Branch. November 1984.

Research publications
Arokodare spent a great part of his professional life on research. The following are publications of some of his research findings.
Road Accident Data, Nigeria 1972-1975: Analysis and Interpretation. Paper read to the Nigerian Society of Engineers, Ibadan Branch. September 1976. Published in the Nigerian Engineer, November 1978.
Data on Some Major Bridges in Nigeria 1960/80: (A co-operation between the Highway Division of the Federal Ministry of Works and the Nigerian Society of Engineers).
Data Storage Publication of the Nigerian Society of Engineers. Published: November 1981.
Engineering Properties of Lateritic Materials for Sub-base and Base Construction of Roads in Nigeria. (A co-operation between the Highway Division of the Federal Ministry of Works and the Nigerian Society of Engineers).

References

1938 births
1993 deaths
Nigerian civil engineers
Ahmadu Bello University alumni
Ahmadu Bello University people
20th-century Nigerian engineers